Casey Powell Lacrosse 16 is a field lacrosse simulation video game developed by Big Ant Studios and published by Crosse Studios for Microsoft Windows, PlayStation 4 and Xbox One that was released on March 9, 2016. Casey Powell was a star lacrosse player at Syracuse University and in Major League Lacrosse.

Community Share has allowed for over 50 collegiate lacrosse teams and more than 9 pro lacrosse teams and developer-created teams.

References

External links
 Casey Powell Lacrosse 16 at Big Ant Studios.com

2016 video games
PlayStation 4 games
Xbox One games
Video games developed in Australia
Multiplayer and single-player video games
Lacrosse video games
Windows games
Powell
Powell
Video games based on real people
Big Ant Studios games